Weekend Nachos were an American hardcore punk band from DeKalb, Illinois.

History
Weekend Nachos began in 2004, after releasing a collection of demos that they had recorded. The band released their debut EP Torture the following year via Tooth Decay Records. In 2006, the band recorded and released a split album with the band Chronic Bleeding Syndrome via Force Fed Records. In 2007, the band released their debut full-length album titled Punish and Destroy via Cowabunga Records. They released their second full-length album, titled Unforgivable, in 2009 via Relapse Records. The band released a third full-length album, titled Worthless, in 2011 via Relapse Records. The band then released a 12" EP titled Bleed via Relapse Records. Also in 2011, the band released a 7" EP titled Black Earth via A389 recordings. The band released a split EP with Lack of Interest in 2012 via Deep Six Records. In 2013, the band released their fourth full-length album, titled Still via Relapse Records.

On January 1, 2016, Weekend Nachos announced via Facebook that they would be retiring as a band. The band simultaneously announced various tour dates, as well as the title of their fifth and final album, "Apology.", to be released in May 2016, via Relapse Records, Cosmic Note and Deep Six Records.

Weekend Nachos played their last show on January 14, 2017 at Subterranean in Chicago, Illinois.

Discography
Studio albums
Punish and Destroy (2007, Cowabunga Records)
Unforgivable (2009, Relapse Records)
Worthless (2011, Relapse Records)
Still (2013, Relapse Records)
Apology (2016, Relapse Records)
EPs, demos and splits
Demo #1 (2004)
Torture (2005, Tooth Decay Records)
 Weekend Nachos / Chronic Bleeding Syndrome - It's A Wonderful Life (2006, Force Fed Records)
Bleed (2010, Relapse Records)
Black Earth (2011, A389 Recordings)
Weekend Nachos / Lack of Interest (2012, Deep Six Records)
Watch You Suffer (2012, A389 Recordings)
 Weekend Nachos / Wojczech - Live At Fluff Fest (2014, Regurgitated Semen Records)
 Weezer Nachos (2015, Run For Cover Records)
Compilations
Two Things At Once (2011, Cowabunga Records)
Miscellaneous
Untitled (2008, Drugged Conscience Records)
Punish and Destroy / Torture (2008, Regurgitated Semen Records)
High Pressure (2015, Blast For Humanity Records)

References

Musical groups established in 2004
Musical groups from Illinois
People from DeKalb, Illinois
Powerviolence groups
2004 establishments in Illinois
Hardcore punk groups from Illinois
Cosmic Note artists